Patrick Mameli (born 23 November 1966) is a Dutch death metal singer and guitarist who is best known for his work with technical death metal band Pestilence.

Mameli is founder and member of Pestilence since their formation in 1986. After eight years and four albums, the band called it quits in 1994, but reunited in 2008, and released three more albums before going on hiatus from 2014 to 2016. During Pestilence's break up, Mameli resurfaced in the Dutch groove metal supergroup C-187 with Cynic drummer Sean Reinert and bassist Tony Choy (formerly in Pestilence), resulting in 2007's Collision. After disbanding C-187, Mameli created 2 more bands: Moordzucht and Neuromorph. In 2018 Mameli toured again with Pestilence with no original band members.

References

1966 births
Living people
Death metal musicians
Dutch male singers
Dutch heavy metal guitarists
Dutch male guitarists
Dutch heavy metal singers
Eight-string guitarists
People from Enschede
Dutch people of Italian descent
Pestilence (band) members